Ohio Township is one of nine townships in Crawford County, Indiana. As of the 2010 census, its population was 742 and it contained 354 housing units.

Geography

Unincorporated towns
 Artist Point
 Beechwood
 Cape Sandy
 Fredonia
 Jericho
 Riddle
 Schooler Point Landing
 Switzer Crossroads
(This list is based on USGS data and may include former settlements.)

Adjacent townships
 Sterling Township (north)
 Jennings Township (northeast)
 Harrison Township, Harrison County (east)
 Boone Township (southwest)
 Oil Township, Perry County (west)
 Union Township (northwest)

Major highways
  Interstate 64
  Indiana State Road 62

Cemeteries
The township contains one cemetery, Wiseman.

References
 United States Census Bureau cartographic boundary files
 U.S. Board on Geographic Names

External links

 Indiana Township Association
 United Township Association of Indiana

Townships in Crawford County, Indiana
Townships in Indiana